The Campbell Branch Little Black River is a short river in Quebec (Canada) and northern Maine (United States).

Campbell Branch Little Black River is a tributary of Little Black River (Saint John River) which flows East, than Southeast crossing the province of New Brunswick up to the North shore of Bay of Fundy. The latest is open to Southwest to Atlantic Ocean.

Geography

The course of the river runs:
  to East, than South-East, up to a brook (from North);
  to South, than East, up to the discharge of a lake (from South-West);
  to Northeast up to the confluence.

Campbell Branch Little Black River empties on the West shore in a bend of the Little Black River (Saint John River). This confluence is located at:
  downstream of West Branch Little Black River (Quebec–Maine).
  at the Northeast of the confluence of Little Black River (Saint John River).

See also

Picard, Quebec, an unorganized territory
Aroostook County, a county of Maine
Kamouraska Regional County Municipality (RCM)
West Branch Little Black River
Saint John River (Bay of Fundy)
List of rivers of Maine
List of rivers of Quebec

References

Maine Streamflow Data from the USGS
Maine Watershed Data From Environmental Protection Agency

External links 

Rivers of Bas-Saint-Laurent
Tributaries of the Saint John River (Bay of Fundy)
Rivers of Aroostook County, Maine
North Maine Woods
International rivers of North America